The New Zealand Nationally Significant Collections and Databases (NSCDs) are government-funded biological and physical collections or databases that are considered important and significant to New Zealand.

They consist of living organisms (ICMP culture collection), preserved samples (the Marine Benthic Biology Collection), or data (the New Zealand Geomagnetic Database). Many of the physical collections also have associated databases.

The NSCDs were established in 1992 during the breakup of the DSIR and establishment of the Crown Research Institutes. They are currently funded at 19 million NZD per annum though the Strategic Science Investment Fund of MBIE.

References

External links 
 MBIE: New Zealand Nationally Significant Collections and Databases
Nationally Significant Databases & Collections Providers' Group

Research in New Zealand
Collections
Biological databases
Environmental science databases